Leona is a genus of skippers in the family Hesperiidae.

Taxonomy
The genus was treated as a synonym of Caenides by Lindsey & Miller in 1965 and by Ackery et al. in 1995. It was later treated as a valid genus by Larsen in 2005.

Species
Leona allyni (Miller, 1971)
Leona halma Evans, 1937
Leona leonora (Plötz, 1879)
Leona meloui (Riley, 1926)
Leona na (Lindsey & Miller, 1965)
Leona stoehri (Karsch, 1893)

Former species
Leona binoevatus (Mabille, 1891) - transferred to Lennia lena (Mabille, 1891) 
Leona lena Evans, 1937 - transferred to Lennia lena (Evans, 1937) 
Leona lissa Evans, 1937 - transferred to Lissia lissa (Evans, 1937) 
Leona lota Evans, 1937 - transferred to Lennia lota (Evans, 1937) 
Leona luehderi (Plötz, 1879) - transferred to Lissia luehderi (Plötz, 1879) 
Leona maracanda (Hewitson, 1876) - transferred to Lennia maracanda (Hewitson, 1876)

References

External links
Natural History Museum Lepidoptera genus database
Seitz, A. Die Gross-Schmetterlinge der Erde 13: Die Afrikanischen Tagfalter. Plate XIII 80

Erionotini
Hesperiidae genera